Federal Supreme Court refers to the supreme court of a federal state. Specific courts with that name are:

 Federal Supreme Court of Switzerland
 Federal Supreme Court of the United Arab Emirates
 Federal Supreme Court of Iraq

See also 
 Federal Court of Malaysia
 Supreme Court of the United States
 Supreme Federal Court of Brazil
 List of supreme courts by country